Michael Roy Roberts  (born 2 October 1947) is a British fashion journalist. He is the fashion and style director of Vanity Fair magazine. He has worked as fashion director for The New Yorker and The Sunday Times, style director and art director for Tatler, design director of British Vogue, Paris editor of Vanity Fair, and editor of Boulevard magazine. 

He has also worked as a fashion photographer and illustrator, contributing images to publications including Vanity Fair; L'Uomo Vogue; British, Italian, French, American, Chinese, Brazilian, and Japanese Vogue; The Sunday Times; and The Independent on Sunday. He has published four books of his illustrations.

Roberts was appointed Commander of the Order of the British Empire (CBE) in the 2022 New Year Honours for services to fashion.

References

British fashion journalists
English male journalists
1947 births
Living people
Commanders of the Order of the British Empire